Shirley Joanna Rivera Zaldaña (born on 22 September 1971) is a Guatemalan politician from the Vamos party, who is president of the Congress for the period 2022–2023 and 2023–2024, she is the third woman to preside over the Congress of Guatemala. Rivera belongs to the more conservative wing of Congress.

References 

1971 births
Living people
Presidents of the Congress of Guatemala
Vamos (Guatemala) politicians